A plyscraper, or timber tower is a skyscraper made (at least partly) of wood. They may alternatively be known as mass timber buildings.

Materials
There are four main types of engineered wood used for mass timber including cross-laminated timber (CLT), glued laminated timber (glulam), laminated strand lumber (LSL), and laminated veneer lumber (LVL).  Of these three wood systems, CLT is the most commonly used.

When other materials, such as concrete or steel, are used in conjunction with engineered wood, these plyscrapers are called “hybrids”.  For hybrid buildings, there are some approaches to how different materials can be used including the “Cree’s System” which was developed by Cree Buildings, and the “Finding the Forest Through the Trees" (FFTT) construction model” developed by Michael Green.  Cree’s System combines the use of concrete and wood mainly in its hybrid flooring systems.  In some instances, concrete can also be used as a core or for the foundation of a building because wood is too light.  The FFTT construction model incorporates a wooden core and wooden floor slabs mixed with steel beams to provide ductility to the building.

Advantages and disadvantages
When considering which engineered wood system to use for a plyscraper the individual benefits of each must be compared. CLT has a high fire resistance due to the fire-resistant adhesive used and the surface char layer that forms when it is exposed to fire.  The surface char layer protects the interior of the wood from further damage.  Glulam is typically used for columns and beams as an alternative to commonly used steel and concrete.  This is because it has a greater tensile strength-to-weight ratio than steel and can resist compression better than concrete.  LVL also has the same strength as concrete.  As plyscrapers are made from wood, they sequester carbon during construction and are renewable if the forests that they are sourced from are sustainably managed.

Despite these benefits, there are bound to be some drawbacks when using the various engineered woods.  Steel overall has a greater strength and durability for the same sized profile when compared to its wood counterpart.  Thus, a building made with steel beams would require smaller beams than the same building constructed with wooden beams.  Walls and columns in the interior spaces of these plyscrapers can get so thick that the size of said interior space gets heavily reduced. This issue however, does not occur within shorter buildings.

Tallest plyscrapers

Over the years, many plyscrapers have been constructed, each becoming taller than the last.  In 2017, the tallest habitable plyscraper was Brock Commons Tallwood House, on the campus of the University of British Columbia near Vancouver, Canada  and measured 53 meters tall (174 feet).  It was overtaken in 2019, when the Mjøstårnet was built in Brumunddal, Norway.  The Mjøstårnet measured 85.4 meters (280 ft).   However, in 2022, the title of the tallest habitable plyscraper shifted once again when the Ascent MKE Building, located in Milwaukee, Wisconsin was built measuring 86.56 meters (284 ft).

Future
The use of mass timber has been popular in Europe for a few years but has started to gain traction in the United States as knowledge of engineered woods has developed and experience with them as construction materials has increased.  Plyscrapers are still in their infancy stage, but as we learn more about mass timber and become more proficient using it, many mass-timber buildings are currently being proposed.  In fact, they are becoming increasingly popular among contractors and builders due to the ease of construction, as putting together a plyscraper is faster and quieter compared to its steel and concrete counterparts.

Several proposals to create more plyscrapers have been made all over the world.  For example, in Tokyo, a plyscraper that is 350 meters (1,148 ft) tall called the W350 Project has been proposed with plans to be complete in 2041.  The W350 Project plans to be a hybrid plyscraper using only 10% steel and the remainder engineered wood.  In London, research and planning are underway for the Oakwood Tower which is estimated to be 304.8 meters (1000 ft) tall.  This would be an 80 story building integrated into the London skyline.  In Chicago, there is a concept proposal for a 228 meter (748 ft) tall building called the River Beech Tower.  The team designing this building plans to implement a system called the exterior diagrid system which would advantage of the natural axial strength of timber allowing for efficient load distribution throughout the whole building.

See also 
 Skyscraper design and construction
 Skyline

References

External links
Wood Skyscrapers, Home to Tall Wood Architecture
2016: The year in wood construction TreeHugger, 2016

Wooden architecture
Plyscraper